Col. Richard W. Holden, Sr. (died August 22, 2014) was the first African-American commander of the North Carolina State Highway Patrol. In 1969, he became one of the first six African Americans to join the Highway Patrol.  Holden took charge of the Highway Patrol in 1999, following a series of scandals. He retired in 2004 after a 35-year career in law enforcement with the rank of colonel.

Dates of rank
1984—first sergeant 
1987—lieutenant
1990—captain
1993—major
1997—lieutenant colonel
1999—colonel

Death
Holden died on Friday, August 22, 2014, at the age of 67. On August 27, 2014, all North Carolina flags were lowered to half-staff to honor him.

References

2014 deaths
African-American history of North Carolina
Year of birth missing
Place of birth missing